Ascension is a 2021 American documentary film directed and produced by Jessica Kingdon. It follows the pursuit of the Chinese dream through the social classes, prioritizing productivity and innovation.

The film had its world premiere at the Tribeca Film Festival on June 12, 2021, where it won Best Documentary Feature. It was released on October 8, 2021, by MTV Documentary Films.

Synopsis
The film follows the Chinese dream through the social classes, prioritizing productivity and innovation.

Production
Initially, Jessica Kingdon planned on making a trilogy of short films focusing on the cycle of production, consumption and waste, however, it was difficult to secure funding for a series, and instead decided to develop the trilogy into a feature film. Kingdon wanted to make a film about capitalism and how it affects viewers in their own countries, and did not want to specifically single out China. Production on the film took place in 51 locations throughout China. The title of the film originates from a poem written by Jessica Kingdon's great-grandfather.

Release
The film had its world premiere at the Tribeca Film Festival on June 12, 2021, where it won Best Documentary Feature and the Albert Maysles Award for Best New Documentary Director. On September 26, 2021, the film had its European premiere at the Zurich Film Festival, where it was entered in the competition for best documentary film.

In August 2021, it was announced MTV Documentary Films had acquired distribution rights to the film, and set it for an October 8, 2021, release.

Reception

Critical reception
Ascension received positive reviews from film critics. On Rotten Tomatoes it has a 98% approval rating based on reviews from 44 critics, with an average rating of 7.90/10. On Metacritic, the film holds a rating of 82 out of 100, based on 12 critics, indicating "universal acclaim".

Accolades

References

External links
 
 
 
 

2021 films
2021 documentary films
American documentary films
Documentary films about businesspeople
Documentary films about consumerism
Films about social class
Works about capitalism
Documentary films about China
2020s American films